Mushond Lee (born December 16, 1970) is an American actor recognized from his recurring role as Jo-Jo Muhammad in NBC's soap opera Sunset Beach. He appeared regularly in season 7 of The Cosby Show. He has also starred in the film 2001 Maniacs as the character Malcolm.

Lee was born in North Trenton, New Jersey. He grew up in Smithville, Galloway Township, New Jersey, and attended Absegami High School, from which he graduated in 1989.

Filmography

Film

Television

References

External links

1967 births
American male film actors
American male television actors
Living people
Absegami High School alumni
People from Galloway Township, New Jersey
Actors from Trenton, New Jersey